Algeria, participated at the 1978 All-Africa Games held at home in Algiers, Algeria. 265 Algerian competitors took part in this competition and won 58 medals.

Medal summary

Medal table

See also
 Algeria at the All-Africa Games

References

1978 All-Africa Games
1978
1978 in Algerian sport